"Prayer of Columbus" is a poem written by American poet Walt Whitman. The poem evokes the enterprising spirit of the Christopher Columbus in a God-fearing light, who rediscovered the North American continent in 1492, leading to the colonization of the Americas by the emerging European powers. Although the Viking Leif Ericson has generally been credited as having discovered the North American continent roughly 500 years earlier, Columbus' rediscovery has had a more lasting impact on the colonization trends that continued until around the onset of World War I. Thus, Whitman's poem serves as a fitting tribute to the proper explorer.

Portions of Whitman's "Prayer of Columbus" have been inscribed in gilded letters in the marble wall of the Archives/Navy Memorial metro station in Washington, D.C.

Musical settings
In modern times the poem has been set to music by various composers including:
 Robert Strassburg

References

External links
Walt Whitman's "Prayer of Columbus"

American poetry
Poetry by Walt Whitman
1900 poems
Cultural depictions of Christopher Columbus
Poems published posthumously